Erigeron calvus  is a very rare species of flowering plants in the family Asteraceae known by the common names bald daisy or bald fleabane. It has been found only once, in a collection made in 1891 at the western foot of the Inyo Mountains near the community of Swansea in Inyo County.

The species is listed as "seriously endangered" and may quite possibly be extinct.

Erigeron calvus  is a small biennial or perennial herb about 12 cm (5 inches) tall, producing a taproot. One plant can produce several flower heads, sometimes one per branch, sometimes in groups of 2 or 3. Each head has 50-100 small ray florets that are small and resemble disc florets, plus numerous genuine disc florets.

References

External links
Calphotos Photo gallery, University of California

calvus
Flora of California
Plants described in 1892